A straw hat is a wide-brimmed hat woven out of straw or straw-like synthetic materials. Straw hats are a type of sun hat designed to shade the head and face from direct sunlight, but are also used in fashion as a decorative element or a uniform.

Materials
Commonly used fibers are:

 Wheat straw: (Milan straw, Tuscan, Livorno), 
 Rye straw: used for the traditional bryl straw hats popular among the peasants of Belarus, southwestern Russia and Ukraine. 
 Toquilla straw: flexible and durable fiber, which is often made into hats, known as Panama hats, in Ecuador.
 Buntal/ Parabuntal straw: from unopened Palm leaves or stems of the Buri Palm, 
 Baku straw: 1x1 woven, made from the young stalks of the Talipot palm from Malabar and Ceylon,
 Braided hemp,  
 Raffia, 
 Shantung straw: made from high performance paper which is rolled into a yarn to imitate straw, historically it was made of buntal
 Toyo straw: cellophane coated Washi, 
 Bangora straw: made from a lower grade of Washi, 
 Paperbraids: made from different paper strands from viscose from different Plants (Swiss Paglinastraw), (Silkpaper, Rice paper), 
 Sisal/ Parasisal (2x2 woven sisal), 
 Seagrass (Xian), 
 Visca straw: an artificial straw made by spinning viscose in a flat filament capable of being braided, woven, or knitted and used especially for women's hats, 
 Rush straw: a thick, stiff straw, used to manufacture inexpensive casual sun hats, made from rush grass (Juncus effesus, Juncus polycephalus), from the bulrushtypes sedge grass (Schoenoplectus lacustris, Cyperus papyrus, Typha (Typha domingensis, syn. Thypha angustata) (bulrush or cattail)} and other types seashore rushgrass (Sporobolus virginicus) or reed   
 Jute,
 Abacá: (for Sinamay hats)
 Ramie,
 Artificial, synthetic straw, PP straw: made from Polypropylene, Polyethylene or from different blends from Acrylic, PP, PE, Polyester, Ramie and Paper
other straw fibers that are mostly used in Asian conical hats are made from different palms (Corypha, Rattan, Trachycarpus, Phoenix), grasses Cane, Bamboo and rice straw (Kasa (hat))
 Chip straw: from White pine, Lombardy poplar, or English willow, has historically been used, but has become less common.

Manufacture 
There are several styles of straw hats, but all of them are woven using some form of plant fibre. Many of these hats are formed in a similar way to felt hats; they are softened by steam or by submersion in hot water, and then formed by hand or over a hat block. Finer and more expensive straw hats have a tighter and more consistent weave. Since it takes much more time to weave a larger hat than a smaller one, larger hats are more expensive.

History 
Straw hats have been worn in Africa and Asia since after the Middle Ages during the summer months, and have changed little between the medieval times and today. They are worn, mostly by men, by all classes. Many can be seen in the calendar miniatures of the Très Riches Heures du Duc de Berry.

The mokorotlo, a local design of a straw hat, is the national symbol of the Basotho and Lesotho peoples, and of the nation of Lesotho. It is displayed on Lesotho license plates.

President Theodore Roosevelt posed for a series of photos at the Panama Canal construction site in 1906. He was portrayed as a strong, rugged leader dressed crisply in light-colored suits and stylish straw fedoras. This helped popularize the straw "Panama hat".

Types of straw hats 
 Boater hat – a formal straw hat with a flat top and brim.
 Buntal hat – a semi-formal or informal traditional straw hat from the Philippines made from buntal fiber
 Conical hat – the distinctive hat worn primarily by farmers in Southeast Asia
 Panama hat – a fine and expensive hat made in Ecuador.
 Sombrero Vueltiao - A straw hat with intricate patterns made from caña flecha by the Zenú people of Colombia.
 Salakot – a traditional conical or pointed rounded hat made usually made from rattan from the Philippines. It can also be made from gourds, tortoiseshell, or other fibers and weaving materials.

Gallery

Arts 
Artwork produced during the Middle Ages shows, among the more fashionably dressed, possibly the most spectacular straw hats ever seen on men in the West, notably those worn in the Arnolfini Portrait of 1434 by Jan van Eyck (tall, stained black) and by Saint George in a painting by Pisanello of around the same date (left). In the middle of the 18th century, it was fashionable for rich ladies to dress as country girls with a low crowned and wide brimmed straw hat to complete the look.

See also 
Straw Hat Riot

References

External links 

Hats
Straw objects